The 2008–09 GET-ligaen season began on 18 September 2008 and ended 22 February 2009.

Regular season

Final standings
GP = Games played; W = Wins; L = Losses; T = Ties; OTW = Overtime Wins; OTL = Overtime losses; GF = Goals for; GA = Goals against; PTS = PointsSource: PointStreak.com1 Vålerenga got deducted 3 points due to unsportsmanlike misconduct by Vålerenga GM Jan Tore Kjær after a match against league winners Sparta Warriors on 5 October 2008.2 Due to poor economy; Stjernen got deducted 15 points, while Furuset and Comet got deducted 10 points.

Statistics

Scoring leaders
GP = Games played; G = Goals; A = Assists; Pts = Points; +/– = Plus/minus; PIM = Penalty minutes

Leading goaltenders
GP = Games played; Min = Minutes played; W = Wins; L = Losses; GA = Goals against; SO = Shutouts; Sv% = Save percentage; GAA = Goals against average

Attendance

Playoffs

Promotion/Relegation
GP = Games played; W = Wins; L = Losses; T = Ties; OTW = Overtime Wins; OTL = Overtime losses; GF = Goals for; GA = Goals against; PTS = PointsSource: hockey.no

References

External links
 

GET-ligaen seasons
Norway
GET